The Battle of Pingxingguan, commonly called the Great Victory of Pingxingguan in Mainland China, was an engagement fought on 25 September 1937, at the beginning of the Second Sino-Japanese War, between the Eighth Route Army of the Chinese Communist Party and the Imperial Japanese Army.

The battle resulted in the loss of 400 to 600 soldiers on both sides, but the Chinese captured 100 trucks full of supplies. The victory gave the Chinese Communists a tremendous boost since it was the only division-size battle that they fought during the entire war.

Background 
After the capture of Beiping (present Beijing) at the end of July 1937, Japanese forces advanced along the Beijing–Baotou railway to Inner Mongolia. Having anticipated the move, Chiang Kai-shek had appointed the Shanxi warlord Yan Xishan as Pacification Director of Taiyuan. Theoretically Yan had authority over all the Chinese military forces in his theatre of operations, including Lin Biao's 115th Division of the Communist 8th Route Army, Liu Ruming's ex-Kuomintang troops and various Central Army contingents responsible to Chiang Kai-shek. In reality these forces operated independently from Yan's provincial army.

Japanese forces, mainly the 5th Division and 11th Independent Mixed Brigade, moved out from Beiping and advanced on Huailai County in Chahar. A Japanese column advanced quickly into Shanxi, making use of the railway which the Chinese did not attempt to destroy. The Chinese abandoned Datong on 13 September, falling back to a line from Yanmen Pass on the Great Wall east to the mountain pass of Pingxingguan. Yan Xishan's troops became more demoralised as the Japanese exerted their air supremacy.

The main body of the Japanese 5th Division, under the command of Itagaki Seishiro, advanced from Huaili to invade northeastern Shanxi. Although it had a motorised transport column, its rate of advance was limited by the poor roads. By the time they reached the Shanxi border, Lin Biao's 115th Division, after a forced march from Shaanxi, was in place at Pingxingguan on 24 September to ambush the Japanese army.

Battle 

The pass of Pingxingguan was a narrow defile worn through the loess, with no exit for several kilometres except the road itself. Lin's division were able to ambush two columns of mainly transportation and supply units and virtually annihilate the trapped Japanese forces.

On 25 September, the 21st brigade of the Japanese 5th Division stationed at Lingqiu received a request from the 21st Regiment that they urgently needed supplies due to falling temperature. The supply troops of the 21st Regiment set out with 70 horse-drawn vehicles with 50 horses, filled with clothes, food, ammunition and proceeded westwards towards Pingxingguan. Around 10:00, the supply column passed into a defile with the two sides rising up more than 10 metres; they were heading towards Caijiayu about 3 km away.

At the same time, a motorized column of Japanese supply troops in about 80 trucks left Guangou and headed east. Both of these non-combat formations entered into the ambush set by the 115th division after 10 a.m. on the 25th and were largely wiped out. A relief force consisting of the 3rd Battalion of the 21st Regiment was rebuffed by Chinese troops and suffered almost 100 casualties. Lin Biao's troops eventually withdrew from the battlefield, allowing the Japanese to finally reach the site of the ambush on 28 September. The Nationalist Air Force of China provided some close-air support for the Chinese ground forces in course of the battles at Pingxingguan.

Japanese casualties in the battle have been estimated at 400 to 500 and the Chinese at about 400. The Chinese forces destroyed about 70 trucks and an equal number of horse-drawn carts and captured 100 rifles, 10 light machine guns, 1 gun and 2,000 shells as well as some clothing and food.

Evaluation 

The Kuomintang's official history of the Second Sino-Japanese War deals with it in a sentence, without any credit to the Communists. On the other hand, the Communists' accounts describe Pingxingguan as a typical example of Red guerrilla tactics, inspired by Mao Zedong's conceptualization of people's war.

Japanese losses were greatly exaggerated for propaganda purposes. However, like the victory at the Battle of Taierzhuang, Pingxingguan was explained by Japan as Japanese officers succumbing to what they came to call "victory disease."

After a series of easy victories against their opponents, they failed to take elementary precautions. Japanese commanders seldom repeated the operational blunders that had led to Pingxingguan. 

Nonetheless, the battle gave the Chinese a major boost in morale and credence to the Communists in the eyes of the people. The battle was constantly cited by CPC leaders as an example of their commitment to battling the Japanese occupation, even though Mao had opposed the battle, according to an account written by Lin Biao in Russia (where he was being treated for bullet wounds) and Lin had undertaken it on his own authority.

See also
 Order of battle Battle of Pingxingguan

References

External links

 Description (in Chinese) of the Battle of Pingxingguan in the on line version of the book: 中国抗日战争正面战场作战记 (China's Anti-Japanese War Combat Operations) by 郭汝瑰 (Guo Rugui), Jiangsu People's Publishing House, 2005-7-1, 
  华北作战平型关大捷 1(North China Battles, the Pingxingguan victory 1)
  华北作战平型关大捷 2(North China Battles, the Pingxingguan victory 2)
 a more recent study (in Chinese)  关于平型关战斗的史实重建问题  "On the reconstruction of the facts of the Battle of Pingxingguan" by Professor Yang Kui Song
 A partial translation of Prof. Yang Kui Songon's article on Axis History Forum: The Battle of Pingxinguan 1937
   Pingxingguan Campaign
  抗战烽火：平型关大捷   (Sino-Japanese War beacon-fire: Pingxingguan victory) Map and photos of the battle, in Chinese
  China AMS Topographic Map of Pingxingguan battle area from Perry–Castañeda Library Map Collection (area near GP5,6)

Pingxingguan
Pingxingguan
Great Wall of China
1937 in China
1937 in Japan
Military history of Shanxi
September 1937 events